Nicolò Zaniolo (born 2 July 1999) is an Italian professional footballer who plays as an attacking midfielder or winger for Süper Lig club Galatasaray and the Italy national team.

Club career

Early career
Born in Massa, Tuscany, Zaniolo grew up in the Fiorentina youth system. On the final day of the 2016 mid year transfer window, he was released by Fiorentina, and subsequently joined Virtus Entella. After several months playing for the Entella Primavera side, Zaniolo was given his professional debut in Serie B on 11 March 2017, aged 17, in a 3–2 win against Benevento. In total, he collected seven appearances for the Biancocelesti in the 2016–17 season.

Inter Milan
On 5 July 2017, Inter Milan announced they had signed Zaniolo, for a reported fee of €1.8 million, plus €1.7 million in bonuses. He played for the Primavera side in the 2017–18 season, finishing top-scorer of the team with 13 goals and winning the Campionato Nazionale Primavera. Zaniolo made his Inter debut in a pre-season friendly on 9 July 2017. On April 14, 2018, manager Spalletti selected him to the first team squad against Atalanta, however he did not play any competitive game for Inter's first team during the season.

Roma

2018–19 season 
In June 2018, it was reported that Zaniolo and Davide Santon had joined Roma as a part of the deal moving Radja Nainggolan to Inter. Zaniolo completed his medical on 25 June, and signed a five-year contract with the club, for a fee of €4.5 million plus 15% resell revenue. He made his first appearance for Roma and UEFA Champions League debut on 19 September, in a 3–0 defeat to Real Madrid at the Santiago Bernabéu. He made his Serie A debut on 26 September 2018, aged 19, in the home match won 4–0 against Frosinone. On 26 December, he scored his first goal in Serie A in a 3–1 win against Sassuolo. The following year, during a UEFA Champions League match against FC Porto, Zaniolo became the youngest Italian player to score twice in a single match in the competition when he scored both of Roma's goals in a 2–1 win. For his efforts, he was named the Serie A Young Player of the Year for 2018-19.

2019–20 season 
Zaniolo picked up where he left off, scoring 4 and assisting 1 in Serie A through 18 matchdays, and continuing to be dangerous as a dribbler. On 12 January 2020, Zaniolo suffered an anterior cruciate ligament injury in his right knee during a 2–1 home loss to Juventus. He returned to training in late June 2020. In addition, he received letters of support from both the Italian and global footballing community, including Roberto Mancini, Roberto Baggio, and Francesco Totti, who had previously been operated by the same surgeon.

Although he had been set to miss the remainder of club football season and highly likely would have missed the upcoming UEFA Euro 2020, all footballing activities in Europe were suspended by March 2020 due to COVID-19 pandemic, with club competitions rescheduled to be played behind closed doors starting in the summer.

On 5 July 2020, Zaniolo made his return-from-injury appearance, coming onto the pitch after 66 minutes in the away Serie A 1–2 loss against Napoli. A week later, Zaniolo scored his first post-injury goal in the away Serie A 3–0 win over Brescia, which was followed by another goal scored at the tail-end of a 6–1 away Serie A win over SPAL on 22 July 2020.

2020–21 season 
Zaniolo missed the entire 2020–21 season due to another anterior cruciate ligament injury sustained in September 2020 over the international break.

2021–22 season: Comeback, Mourinho, and Conference League 
He returned to the pitch in July 2021 during pre-season, under newly appointed coach José Mourinho.

Zaniolo's first season back was marked by struggles both with fitness and with refereeing. Throughout the season, players frequently fouled Zaniolo without punishment. It came to such an extreme that manager Mourinho eventually said, "“I will finish with one observation. I want to say something that probably goes against my interests: if I were Nicolo Zaniolo, I would start thinking that perhaps playing in Serie A means things will be stacked against me.”

Zaniolo scored his first goal since his return from his second knee injury in the 3–0 win over Trabzonspor in the inaugural UEFA Europa Conference League. He scored a hat trick against Bodo/Glimt in the quarterfinals of the Europa Conference League to confirm Roma's passage to the semifinals, his first such. On 25 May 2022, he scored the only goal as Roma beat Feyenoord in the final to win the Europa Conference League.

2022–23 season: end of Rome era

After the 2021–22 season, rumours swirled about Zaniolo's exit. Roma communicated a willingness to transfer him in June, but demanded a 50 million euro payment. Zaniolo meanwhile asked for a contract renewal at 4.5 million euros, a number which would have made him joint-top earner alongside Lorenzo Pellegrini and Paulo Dybala. This saga dominated the off-field stories about Roma and Zaniolo. 

On the field, Zaniolo continued his struggle for form, deployed as a right sided hold-up player, playing through thigh and shoulder injuries. While he scored 2 goals in the UEFA Europa League, he only scored 1 league goal. This culminated in Zaniolo being booed off the field during a victory in the Coppa Italia vs Genoa, after which Zaniolo submitted a transfer request. After a mob appeared at Zaniolo's house, he fled to La Spezia, where he and the club agreed that he would not appear in any future matches until the transfer window. At the close of the Italian transfer window, the club listed Zaniolo in their Europa League squad for the next phase, but signalled that Zaniolo would not be welcome in the club training ground until the end of the season.

Galatasaray

2022–23 season 

On 8 February 2023, it was announced that Zaniolo would officially transfer to Süper Lig side Galatasaray on a permanent basis. For the transfer, a purchase fee of €15M and another 20% of his next move will be paid to the Roma club, a transfer which set the Turkish transfer record. Zaniolo's contract is reported to have a 35 million euro release clause. His transfer news was not announced effusively by Galatasaray due to the earthquake that had occurred a few days before his arrival. He took the number 17 in memory of a young Galatasaray fan (aged 17) who died in the earthquake. 

He made an impressive debut with his new club in a friendly against Alanyaspor on 26 February, coming on in the 80th minute and scoring a goal in stoppage time. He scored another goal and provided an assist in a friendly match against İstanbulspor on 4 March. Zaniolo scored on his official debut for the club on 11 March, a 1–0 league win at home over Kasımpaşa.

International career

Youth 
With the Italy under-19 side, Zaniolo took part in the 2018 UEFA European Under-19 Championship, reaching the final of the tournament, which Italy lost 4–3 after extra time against Portugal.

He made his debut with the Italy U21 team on 11 October 2018, under manager Luigi Di Biagio, in a 1–0 friendly defeat to Belgium.

Senior 
On 1 September 2018, he was given his first senior international call-up for Italy by manager Roberto Mancini – without having received a cap in Serie A – for Italy's opening UEFA Nations League matches against Poland and Portugal later that month.

He made his debut with the senior team on 23 March 2019, entering as a substitute for Verratti in a 2–0 home win over Finland in Italy's opening UEFA Euro 2020 qualifying match. He made his first start for Italy on 15 October, in a 5–0 away win against Liechtenstein, in a Euro 2020 qualifier (the opposition that day included Yanik Frick,  a childhood friend). His first international goals came on 18 November, a brace in a 9–1 home win over Armenia, in Italy's final Euro 2020 qualifier; he also set up Ciro Immobile's second goal during the match.

On 7 September 2020, after being called up for the start of Italy's campaign in the 2020–21 UEFA Nations League, he suffered a second anterior cruciate ligament injury in eight months, this time in his left knee, in an eventual 1–0 away win over the Netherlands.

Style of play
A versatile player, due to his creativity, technique, work-rate, energy, and physicality, he can operate in several midfield positions, and has been used as an attacking midfielder or "trequartista," as an offensive-minded central midfielder or "mezzala," as a box-to-box midfielder, and even as a deep-lying playmaker.

He can even play out on the flanks, due to his goalscoring abilities, ability to create chances for teammates, the breadth he provides, and the attacking threat he poses with his striking ability from distance and penchant for making late runs. A talented player, he was once considered one of Italy's and Europe's most promising young prospects.

Personal life

Career statistics

Club

International

Scores and results list Italy's goal tally first.

Honours
Roma
 UEFA Europa Conference League: 2021–22

Italy U19
 UEFA European Under-19 Championship runner-up: 2018

Individual
 UEFA European Under-19 Championship Team of the Tournament (Substitutes): 2018
 Serie A Best Young Player: 2018–19

References

External links

 
 FIGC profile 
 
 

1999 births
Living people
People from Massa
Association football midfielders
Italian footballers
Serie A players
Serie B players
Süper Lig players
Italy youth international footballers
Italy under-21 international footballers
Italy international footballers
Virtus Entella players
Inter Milan players
A.S. Roma players
Galatasaray S.K. footballers
Italian expatriate footballers
Expatriate footballers in Turkey
Italian expatriate sportspeople in Turkey
Sportspeople from the Province of Massa-Carrara
Footballers from Tuscany
UEFA Europa Conference League winning players